The Hot Metal Bridge is a truss bridge in Pittsburgh, Pennsylvania, that crosses the Monongahela River. The bridge consists of two parallel spans on a single set of piers: the former Monongahela Connecting Railroad Bridge, built in 1887, on the upstream side and the former Hot Metal Bridge, built in 1900, on the downstream side. The Monongahela Connecting Railroad Bridge carried conventional railroad traffic, while the Hot Metal Bridge connected parts of the J&L Steel mill, carrying crucibles of molten iron from the blast furnaces in ladle transfer cars to the open hearth furnaces on the opposite bank to be converted to steel. During World War II 15% of America's steel making capacity crossed over the Hot Metal Bridge, up to 180 tons per hour. The upstream span was converted to road use after a $14.6 million restoration, and opened by Mayor Tom Murphy with a ceremony honoring former steel workers on June 23, 2000.  The bridge connects 2nd Avenue at the Pittsburgh Technology Center in South Oakland with Hot Metal Street (South 29th Street) in the South Side. The downstream span reopened for pedestrian and bicycle use in late 2007 after two years of work. The Great Allegheny Passage hiker/biker trail passes over this bridge as it approaches  Pittsburgh's Golden Triangle area.

The Pittsburgh History and Landmarks Foundation was responsible for managing the decorative lighting project for the bridge, which was lit with energy-efficient light-emitting diode (LED) and optical fiber technology on June 12, 2008.

The Hot Metal Bridge was inducted into the North America Railway Hall of Fame in 2016.

Popular culture
The Hot Metal Bridge is the namesake of the defunct Hot Metal Grille at the nearby SouthSide Works shopping center and also is the name of the online magazine of the University of Pittsburgh, a literary magazine.

The bridge was in several scenes of the 2011 film Warrior starring Jennifer Morrison and Nick Nolte.

See also
List of bridges documented by the Historic American Engineering Record in Pennsylvania
List of crossings of the Monongahela River
Pittsburgh bridges
Great Allegheny Passage
Pig iron

References

External links

Hot Metal Bridge at pghbridges.com
Pittsburgh Post-Gazette - Official reopening of the bridge after the conversion
Pittsburgh Post-Gazette - Article on conversion of bridge to pedestrian and bicycle use
Pittsburgh Post-Gazette - High bids threaten the conversion project
Pittsburgh Post-Gazette - Groundbreaking on the new project

Bridges in Pittsburgh
Bridges over the Monongahela River
Bridges completed in 1887
Bridges completed in 1900
Historic American Engineering Record in Pennsylvania
Pittsburgh History & Landmarks Foundation Historic Landmarks
Road bridges in Pennsylvania
Railroad bridges in Pennsylvania
Pedestrian bridges in Pennsylvania
Truss bridges in the United States
Metal bridges in the United States
1887 establishments in Pennsylvania